This is a summary of the electoral history of Gordon Brown, who served as Prime Minister of the United Kingdom and Leader of the Labour Party from 2007 to 2010. He was the member of parliament (MP) for Dunfermline East from 1983 to 2005 and Kirkcaldy and Cowdenbeath from 2005 to 2015.

Parliamentary elections

1979 general election, Edinburgh South

1983 general election, Dunfermline East

1987 general election, Dunfermline East

1992 general election, Dunfermline East

1997 general election, Dunfermline East

2001 general election, Dunfermline East

2005 general election, Kirkcaldy and Cowdenbeath

2010 general election, Kirkcaldy and Cowdenbeath

2010 United Kingdom general election

References

Brown, Gordon
Gordon Brown
Brown, Gordon